António Aurélio Gonçalves, better known as Nhô Roque (25 September 1901 – 30 September 1984), was a Cape Verdean writer, critic, historian and professor.

Life
Gonçalves was born in the city of Mindelo, capital of the island of São Vicente. He was the son of Roque da Silva Gonçalves.  He was absent from the island for 22 years after he headed to the imperial capital of Lisbon in 1917 after his high-school studies at the seminary on the island of São Nicolau. He attended the University of Lisbon where he studied medicine for two years.  Later, he studied Fine Arts, history and philosophy.  In 1938, he published a dissertation on irony in the work by Eça de Queiroz.  He returned to his native island in early 1939.

He was a critic in many different areas, book prefaces, literary seminaries of the Professor's Course Formation of the Secondary School, articles and reviews with Ponto & Vírgula, a Portuguese word for "semicolon".

He was professor of history and philosophy at the Mindelo (Liceu central do Mindelo) and Gil Eanes Lyceums and the technical school.  He published several works and wrote for the major Cape Verdean review Claridade and the story O enterro de nha candinha Sena (1957).  His other work Noite de Vento (Night Wind) was translated into French, his first work to be translated into a difference language.

Gonçalves died on 30 September 1984 as the result of a hit-and-run accident five days after his 83rd birthday.

Family
He belonged to a family of great literary figures, including the poet José Lopes da Silva and the writer Baltasar Lopes da Silva.

Legacy
A street (Rua Dr. António Aurélio Gonçalves) is named after him in his hometown Mindelo, and to the west is a park that is known by his nickname (Parque Nhô Roque), located by Avenida Marginal and Porto Grande Bay. 

Along with Eugénio Tavares he was featured on a Cape Verdean $1000 escudo banknote issued between 2007 and 2014, and he was also featured on a Cape Verdean postage stamp.  In the national capital of Praia, the António Aurélio Gonçalves Instutide (IpAAG, the Instituto para António Aurélio Gonçalves) is named in his honour.

Works
Aspecto da Ironia de Eça de Queiroz (Aspect of Irony), essay, 1937
Recaída, or Aurelio Recaída; 1947; reimpression: 1993; Editora Vega
Terra da Promissão (Promised Land); reimpression: 2002, Lisboa, Caminho Publishing; with preface by Arnaldo França
Noite de Vento (Windy Night), 1951: 2nd edição: Praia, 1985; with preface by Arnaldo França
Prodiga (Prodigy), 1956
Historia do Tempo Antigo, (History of the Earlier Times), 1960
Virgens Loucas, theatrical play, 1971
Biluca, 1977
Miragem (Mirage), 1978

References

Further reading
Rebecca J. Atencio, "Para uma leitura pós-colonial de António Aurélio Gonçalves: o potencial subversivo da imitção em Pródige e Virgens Loucas" ("On the Post-Colonial Letter by António Aurélio Gonçalves"), in Africa (São Paulo), 2006–2007, no. 27–28, p. 9–22

External links
António Aurélio Gonçalves at Encyclopædia Britannica
António Aurélio Gonçalves's 100th Birthday : António Aurélio Gonçalves e a influência de Eça de Queirós. A ironia como opção estética e ética, celebration of António Aurélio Gonçalves's 100th Birthday by Elsa Rodrigues dos Santos. 

1901 births
1984 deaths
Cape Verdean male writers
Cape Verdean academics
Cape Verdean expatriates in Portugal
People from Mindelo
Writers from São Vicente, Cape Verde
University of Lisbon alumni